Mount Peskett is a  mountain summit located in the North Saskatchewan River valley of Alberta, Canada. Mount Peskett is situated in the Canadian Rockies on the northern boundary the Siffleur Wilderness Area. Its nearest higher peaks are Mount Loudon,  to the south, and Siffleur Mountain 3.7 km to the southeast. Mount Peskett can be seen from Highway 11, the David Thompson Highway. Precipitation runoff from the mountain flows north via Loudon Creek and Spreading Creek which are both tributaries of the North Saskatchewan River.

History

The peak was named by Len Siemens in 1968 after Reverend Louis W. Peskett (1931-1966), a director of Youth for Christ who was killed by a falling rock in the vicinity of nearby Mount Cline.

The mountain's name became official in 1968 when approved by the Geographical Names Board of Canada.

The first ascent was made in 1970 by Leo Grillmair, W.L. Putman, and D. Von Hennig.

Geology

Mount Peskett is composed of sedimentary rock laid down from the Precambrian to Jurassic periods that was pushed east and over the top of younger rock during the Laramide orogeny.

Climate

Based on the Köppen climate classification, Mount Peskett is located in a subarctic climate with cold, snowy winters, and mild summers. Temperatures can drop below -20 °C with wind chill factors below -30 °C.

See also
List of mountains in the Canadian Rockies
Geography of Alberta
Geology of the Rocky Mountains

References

External links
 Flickr: Mt. Peskett photo
 Weather forecast: Mount Peskett

Three-thousanders of Alberta
Canadian Rockies
Alberta's Rockies